NBUMP is a highly selective 5-HT1A receptor partial agonist (Ki = 0.1 nM; IA = 40%) with an arylpiperazine structure. It is one of the highest affinity ligands for the 5-HT1A receptor known. It displays 460- and 260-fold selectivity for 5-HT1A over the α1-adrenergic and D2 receptors, respectively.

See also 
 Adatanserin

References 

Phenylpiperazines
5-HT1A agonists
Serotonin receptor agonists
Adamantanes
Carboxamides
Phenol ethers